The POC-PSC Philippine National Games (PNG) is a multi-sport tournament in the Philippines. It includes the sport of Indoor and Beach Volleyball for both men and women. 
The most recent title holders were the Philippine Air Force Air Men and Women for Indoor Volleyball for both men's and women's title while University of Santo Tomas Kris Roy Guzman and Mark Gil Alfafara, and Flormel Rodriguez and Therese Ramos of CEBU won the men's and women's beach volleyball respectively.

Results

Indoor Volleyball
Men's Division

Women's Division

Beach Volleyball
Men's Division

Women's Division

External links
POC-PSC Philippine National Games Website
2012 POC-PSC Philippine National Games Final Results
2013 POC-PSC Philippine National Games Final Results
Official Invitation POC-PSC Philippine National Games Volleyball and Beach Volleyball

See also
 Philippine Volleyball Federation
 Philippine Olympic Committee
 Philippine Sports Commission

References

Volleyball in the Philippines